Lerato Lydia Sechele (born 10 March 1994) is a Lesotho triple jumper.

Career 
As a junior Sechele won the silver medal at the 2011 African Junior Championships and the gold medal at the 2013 African Junior Championships. She also finished tenth at the 2011 All-Africa Games.

Sechele competed at the 2014 Commonwealth Games without reaching the final, and finished fourth at the 2018 Commonwealth Games.

Her personal best jump is 13.57 metres, achieved at the 2018 Commonwealth Games in Gold Coast. This is the current Lesotho record.

References

1994 births
Living people
Lesotho female athletes
Female triple jumpers
Athletes (track and field) at the 2014 Commonwealth Games
Athletes (track and field) at the 2018 Commonwealth Games
Commonwealth Games competitors for Lesotho
Athletes (track and field) at the 2019 African Games
African Games competitors for Lesotho